The Stu Erwin Show (also known as Trouble with Father) is an American sitcom which aired on ABC from 1950 to 1955. Only four of the series’ five seasons on the network included new episodes; the 1953–54 season consisted entirely of reruns.

Synopsis
The series' star, Stuart Erwin, played a bumbling high school principal named Stu Erwin. His wife, film ingenue from the late silent and early sound period, June Collyer, played the principal's wife, June Erwin. Although Erwin and Collyer, who were married in 1931, had a son and a daughter, the series presented them as parents of two adolescent daughters played by Sheila James and Ann Todd who was replaced by Merry Anders in the series' final season. One notable aspect of the show was that it featured black actor Willie Best in a regular supporting role.

Predating modern single-camera sitcoms, The Stu Erwin Show originally aired without a laugh track (one was added in its final season), and each episode was around 26 minutes long, without commercials. During its original network run on ABC, it was sponsored by General Mills (1950–54), Paper Mate (1953-'54) and Liggett & Myers (1954–55).

Production
The series was produced by Roland D. Reed and Hal Roach, Jr., and filmed at Hal Roach Studios in Culver City, California. All 52 episodes of season one were first-run, followed by another 26 in season two for a total of 78 straight weeks of all-new shows before reruns began in the spring of 1952. Another 26 episodes were produced for the 1952–53 season, interspersed with reruns every third week between October 1952 and July 1953. Production then went on a lengthy hiatus while the network continued airing reruns from the summer of 1953 until the fall of 1954. The fourth and final season's 26 episodes aired between October 1954 and April 1955.

Episodes

Season 1 (1950–51)

Season 2 (1951–52)

Season 3 (1952–53)

Season 4 (1954–55)

Syndication and Home release
The series was widely syndicated by Official Films through the late 1960s. The show is currently seen on the Retro TV Network as of July 2018.

Many episodes of the program have fallen into the public domain. As such, various budget DVD releases of public domain episodes have been released.

References

External links
 
 The Stu Erwin Show at The Classic TV Archive
 

1950 American television series debuts
1955 American television series endings
1950s American sitcoms
American Broadcasting Company original programming
Black-and-white American television shows
English-language television shows
Television series about educators